The Chief of Defence Staff (C LEDS ) is the chief of the Defence Staff at the Swedish Armed Forces Headquarters. The Chief of Defence Staff is appointed as a three-star general or admiral. The Chief of Defence Staff is part of the Defence Board (Försvarsmaktsledningen, FML), a group of the Supreme Commander's top commanders.

Organisation
At the Swedish Armed Forces Headquarters's reorganization on 1 April 2007, the Defence Staff (Ledningsstaben, LEDS) was created. It handles major strategic issues, such as planning the Swedish Armed Forces' operations and financial control of the agency. The staff leads, coordinates and monitors the activities of the Swedish Armed Forces Headquarters. The Defence Staff is in turn divided into departments with different responsibilities. The departments are:

Plans and Finance Department (Planerings- och ekonomiavdelningen, LEDS PLANEK)
Policy and Plans Department (Inriktningsavdelning, LEDS INRI), headed by the Chief of Policy and Plans Department
Communications Department (Kommunikationsavdelningen, LEDS KOMM), headed by the Director of Communication and Public Affairs
Chief Information Officer Department (CIO-avdelningen, LEDS CIO)
Legal Department (Juridiska avdelningen, LEDS JUR)
Human Resources Department (Personalavdelningen, LEDS PERS), headed by the Director of Human Resources
Total Defence Department (Totalförsvarsavdelningen, LEDS TF).

In addition, there is a staff department for coordination and support to the agency's management. The Chief of Defence Staff is also head of the headquarters. The Chief of Defence Staff has extensive duties and powers, for example with regard to international cooperation and international agreements. The Chief of Defence Staff has, in his support, a deputy head of the headquarters and the administrative headquarters department.

The Chief of Defence Staff reports directly to the Supreme Commander of the Swedish Armed Forces and the chief financial officer of the Swedish Armed Forces reports to the Chief of Defence Staff.

Chiefs of Defence Staff

Deputy Chiefs of Defence Staff

Footnotes

References

Military appointments of Sweden
Sweden